Koray Avcı may refer to:

 Koray Avcı (footballer)
 Koray Avcı (musician)